Don M. Newman (July 31, 1923 – January 24, 2021) was an American pharmacist who served as the United States Under Secretary of Health and Human Services under President Ronald Reagan from 1985 to 1989. In 1990, he was appointed a United States Representative on the Council of the International Civil Aviation Organization, and served until 1994. He attended Purdue University (B.S., 1947), Georgetown University Law Center (J.D., 1979), and Indiana University (M.S.B.A., 1972; M.B.A., 1989). He died in January 2021, at the age of 97.

References

External links

1923 births
2021 deaths
American pharmacists
Georgetown University Law Center alumni
Indiana University alumni
Purdue University alumni
Permanent Representatives of the United States to the International Civil Aviation Organization